Larisa Yuryevna Belokon (born 18 May 1964) is a Soviet breaststroke swimmer who mostly competed in the 100 m and 200 m breastroke and 4 × 100 m medley relay. In these events she won a bronze and two silver medals at the 1981 European Aquatics Championships and three gold medals at the 1983 Summer Universiade. She missed the 1984 Summer Olympics due to the boycott by the Soviet Union and took part in the Friendship Games instead, winning three medals in the same three events.
 
Since 2009 Belokon has been living in the Moscow Oblast, in the early 2010s she competed in swimming in the masters category. After marriage she changed her last name to Pashkanova.

References

External links
Profile at Infosport.ru 

1964 births
Living people
Sportspeople from Tashkent
Soviet female breaststroke swimmers
Russian female breaststroke swimmers
European Aquatics Championships medalists in swimming
Universiade medalists in swimming
Universiade gold medalists for the Soviet Union
Medalists at the 1983 Summer Universiade